The Sheffield Jumpers are a dance troupe and group of musicians from Rotterdam, who practice the jumpstyle type of dancing and music. They are most well known with their performances with German band Scooter. The name "Sheffield Jumpers" came from H.P. Baxxter's own suggestion, because the Jumpers wanted a new identity, and until then were known as the "Scooter Jumpers".

They gained popularity in the videos for "The Question Is What Is the Question?", "And No Matches", "Jumping All Over the World" and "Jump That Rock (Whatever You Want)". In August 2008, they released their first single "Jump with Me". The Sheffield Jumpers toured with Scooter during the 2008 Jumping All Over the World Tour, and during Clubland Live 2008. They once again toured with Scooter in 2010 during the Under the Radar Over the Top Tour.

Discography

Singles

Music videos

References

External links
Official Website

Dutch electronic music groups
Dutch dance music groups